New Reading is an unincorporated community in Perry County, Ohio, United States. The Randolph Mitchell House, which is listed on the National Register of Historic Places, is located in New Reading.

References

Unincorporated communities in Perry County, Ohio
Unincorporated communities in Ohio